August Conrady (Chi. 孔好古) (28 April 1864, Wiesbaden - 4 June 1925, Leipzig) was a German sinologist and linguist. From 1897 he was professor at the University of Leipzig.

Conrady first studied classical philology, comparative linguistics and Sanskrit; he continued with Tibetan and Chinese language. He put forward his research findings in 1896 on the relationship between the prefix and tones in the Sino-Tibetan languages, in the work Eine Indo-Chinesische causative-Denominativ-Bildung und ihr Zusammenhang mit den Tonaccenten (1896).

He worked with Sven Hedin, translating the roughly 150 3rd century manuscripts Hedin had found in the ruins of Loulan in 1901. Conrady purchased a part of the castle Mildenburg in Miltenberg, Bavaria, when it was auctioned off after the death of his uncle,  to exhibit his art collection.

He became extraordinary professor of sinology in Leipzig in 1896, that had among its students as future sinologist leaders Gustav Haloun, Otto Maenchen-Helfen, Lin Yutang, Bruno Schindler and his nephew and successor in Leipzig, Eduard Erkes. In 1916 he put forward the theory of an original relationship between Austric and Sino-Tibetan languages. He became a full professor of Sinology in 1920. Materials from the Danish orientalist Kurt Wulff concluded partially in Conrady's development of the theory, and Wulff continued Conrady's work in this field.

Works (selected)

References

 Johannes Hertel: «Nekrolog auf August Conrady», i: Berichte über die Verhandlungen der Sächsischen Akademie der Wissenschaften zu Leipzig, Philologisch-historische Klasse, v 77 #4 (1926) 7-14
 Bruno Schindler: Der Wissenschaftliche Nachlass August Conradys. AM 3 (1926) 104-115
 Eduard Erkes: «Georg von der Gabelentz und August Conrady», i: Ernst Engelberg (red.): Beiträge zu Universitätsgeschichte 1405-1959, Karl-Marx-Universität Leipzig v1 (1959) 439-463
 David B Honey: Incense at the Altar. AOS 2001, 132f
 Christina Leibfried: «Sinologie an der Universität Leipzig: Entstehung und Wirken des Ostasiatischen Seminars 1878 bis 1947», i: Beiträge zur Leipziger Universitäts- und Wissenschaftsgeschichte, ser B v1 (2003)

External links
 Prof. Dr. phil. habil. August Conrady, Professorenkatalog der Universität Leipzig.
 Conrady, August, Deutsche Biographie.

German sinologists
Linguists from Germany
1864 births
1925 deaths
German male non-fiction writers
Paleolinguists
Linguists of Sino-Tibetan languages